Dogger Bank (Dutch: Doggersbank, German: Doggerbank, Danish: Doggerbanke) is a large sandbank in a shallow area of the North Sea about  off the east coast of England.

During the last ice age the bank was part of a large landmass connecting mainland Europe and the British Isles, now known as Doggerland. It has long been known by fishermen to be a productive fishing bank; it was named after the doggers, medieval Dutch fishing boats especially used for catching cod.

At the beginning of the 21st century the area was identified as a potential site for a UK round 3 wind farm, being developed as Dogger Bank Wind Farm.

Name
The name Dogger Bank was first recorded in the mid-17th century.  It is probably derived from the word "dogger" used for a two-masted boat of the type that trawled for fish in the area in medieval times.  The area has similar names in Dutch, German, and Danish.

It gives its name to the Dogger sea area used in the BBC Radio 4 Shipping Forecast.

Geography

Geology
Geologically, the feature is most likely a moraine, formed during the Pleistocene. At differing times during the last glacial period it was either joined to the mainland or an island. The bank was part of a large landmass, now known as Doggerland, which connected Britain to the European mainland until it was flooded some time after the end of the last glacial period.

Fishing trawlers working the area have dredged up large amounts of moorpeat, remains of mammoth and rhinoceros, and occasionally Palaeolithic hunting artefacts.

The 1931 Dogger Bank earthquake took place below the bank, measuring 6.1 on the Richter scale and was the largest earthquake ever recorded in the United Kingdom.  Its hypocentre was  beneath the bank, and the quake was felt in countries all around the North Sea, causing damage across eastern England.

South of Dogger Bank is the Cleaver Bank.

Naval battles and incidents

 Battle of Dogger Bank (1696), during the Nine Years' War a French fleet under the command of Jean Bart was victorious over the ships of a Dutch force of five ships and the convoy it was escorting.
 Battle of Dogger Bank (1781), during the Fourth Anglo-Dutch War, a Royal Navy squadron fought a Dutch squadron on 5 August 1781.
 Dogger Bank incident, during the Russo-Japanese War, Russian naval ships opened fire on British fishing boats in the area of Dogger Bank on 21 October 1904, mistaking them for Japanese torpedo boats. 
 Battle of Dogger Bank (1915) and Battle of Dogger Bank (1916), during the First World War, saw battles between the Royal Navy and the German High Seas Fleet.

Several shipwrecks lie on the bank. In 1966, the German submarine U-Hai, a German Type XXIII submarine, sank during a gale. 19 of 20 men died, one of the worst peacetime naval disasters in German history.

Ecology
The bank is an important fishing area, with cod and herring being caught in large numbers.  
Dogger Bank has been identified as an oceanic environment that exhibits high primary productivity throughout the year in the form of phytoplankton. As such, it was proposed to designate the area a Marine Nature Reserve. 
Under European Union legislation, the protected area has been divided between several countries, including the UK.

Trawling and protected areas
In September 2020, Greenpeace dropped several granite boulders from their ship Esperanza on the Dogger Bank area. Concerns had been raised when a supertrawler had been seen off the Yorkshire coast. The action undertaken by Greenpeace had support from some of those in the fishing trade. 
The large granite rocks are harmless to marine life and surface fishing, but they get entangled in the weighted nets of bottom trawlers, obstructing the practice. A Greenpeace spokesperson said "how can you continue to allow bottom trawlers to plough the seabed in a protected area? .... [it] is the equivalent to allowing bulldozers to plough through a protected forest."

Wind farm and wind power hub

The Dogger Bank was selected for offshore wind farms because it is far away from shore, avoiding complaints about the visual impact of wind turbines, yet the water is shallow enough for traditional fixed foundation wind turbine designs.

In January 2010, a licence to develop a wind farm on Dogger Bank was granted to Forewind Ltd, a consortium of developers. Originally projected to develop up to 9 gigawatts of power as part of a planned nine zone project of 32 gigawatts, the plan was later scaled down to a 7.2-gigawatt installation in agreement with the area's owner Crown Estates.

Construction was scheduled to start around 2014 at the earliest, but has been repeatedly postponed.

Dutch, German, and Danish electrical grid operators are cooperating in a project to build a North Sea Wind Power Hub complex on one or more artificial islands to be constructed on Dogger Bank as part of a European system for sustainable electricity. At the North Seas Energy Forum in Brussels on 23 March 2017, Energinet.dk will sign a contract to work with the German and Dutch branches of TenneT; thereafter a feasibility study will be produced.

See also
 , the name of one of the sea regions of the British Shipping Forecast
 , a dermatological condition common in North Sea fishmen
 
 
 Other places under the North Sea:

References

External links
 

Sandbanks of the North Sea
Fishing areas of the North Sea
Sandbanks of England
Shipping Forecast areas
Special Areas of Conservation
Undersea banks of the Atlantic Ocean